The Baháʼí Faith is a relatively new religion teaching the essential worth of all religions and the unity of all people, established by Baháʼu'lláh in the 19th-century Middle East and now estimated to have a worldwide following of 5–8 million adherents, known as Baháʼís.

The following outline is provided as an overview of and a topical guide to the Baháʼí Faith.

Beliefs and practices

Baháʼí teachings
Baháʼí teachings
 God in the Baháʼí Faith
 Baháʼí Faith and the unity of religion – the Baháʼí belief that many of the world's different religions were revealed by God as part of one gradually unfolding plan
 Progressive revelation (Baháʼí) – the Baháʼí belief that God progressively reveals the truth through successive Manifestations of God
 Baháʼí Faith and Zoroastrianism
 Baháʼí Faith and Hinduism
 Baháʼí Faith and Buddhism
 Muhammad in the Baháʼí Faith
 Manifestation of God (Baháʼí Faith) – individuals whom Baháʼís believe were sent by God to establish religious teachings appropriate for their time and place, such as the Buddha, Jesus, and Muhammad
 Baháʼí Faith on life after death
 Baháʼí cosmology
 Faith in the Baháʼí Faith
 Baháʼí views on sin
 Martyrdom in the Baháʼí Faith
 Aniconism in the Baháʼí Faith – the Baháʼí prohibition on images of God or those seen as Manifestations of God
 Covenant of Baháʼu'lláh
 Covenant-breaker
 Baháʼí views on science

Baháʼí social principles
 Baháʼí Faith and the unity of humanity – the Baháʼí teaching that humanity is fundamentally one and should achieve a state of unity in diversity
 Baháʼí Faith and Native Americans
 New world order (Baháʼí)
 Baháʼí perspective on international human rights
 Baháʼí Faith and gender equality
 Baháʼí Faith and education
 Baháʼí Faith and auxiliary language – the Baháʼí teaching that the world should adopt a worldwide auxiliary language in addition to people's various languages to facilitate the unity of humanity
 Socioeconomic development and the Baháʼí Faith

Baháʼí laws
Baháʼí laws – practices that are religiously binding for Baháʼís
 Prayer in the Baháʼí Faith – Baháʼí teachings on prayer, including both daily obligatory prayer and devotional prayer (general prayer)
 Obligatory Baháʼí prayers
 Nineteen Day Feast – a gathering of a local Baháʼí community that occurs on the first day of each month of the Baháʼí calendar
 Huqúqu'lláh – the Baháʼí obligation to give to the Baháʼí funds, which support the activities of Baháʼí communities
 Nineteen Day Fast – a period of fasting that Baháʼís observe from sunrise to sunset for 19 days once each year
 Baháʼí marriage
 Baháʼí views on homosexuality
 Baháʼí pilgrimage

History

History of the Baháʼí Faith – events from 1863 to the present that had their background in two earlier movements in the nineteenth century, Shaykhism and Bábism
 Shaykhism – a Shi'a Islamic religious movement founded by Shaykh Ahmad (1753–1826)
 Bábism – a religion founded by the Báb in 1844 that Baháʼís see as a predecessor to the Baháʼí Faith; see Outline of Bábism
 Baháʼí–Azali split – the split of the followers of Bábism into Baháʼís, who accepted Baháʼu'lláh as a figure prophesied in the teachings of Bábism, and Azalis, who followed Subh-i-Azal
 Baháʼí prophecies
 Attempted schisms in the Baháʼí Faith
 ʻAbdu'l-Bahá's journeys to the West
 World Unity Conference
 Baháʼí World Congress
 Baháʼí teaching plans
 Baháʼí radio
 Persecution of Baháʼís
 Seven Martyrs of Tehran
 1903 Isfahan anti-Baháʼí riots
 Statements about the persecution of Baháʼís
 Baháʼí 7
 Egyptian identification card controversy
 Baháʼí Faith by country – estimated numbers of Baháʼís globally, by country, and by continent, with links to full articles on the Baháʼí Faith in individual countries and continents
 Baháʼí Faith in Africa
 Baháʼí Faith in Asia
 Baháʼí Faith in Europe
 Baháʼí Faith in North America
 Baháʼí Faith in Oceania
 Baháʼí Faith in South America

Important figures

Central figures
 The Báb – the founder of the Bábism, seen by Baháʼís as the predecessor to their religion
 Baháʼu'lláh – the founder of the Baháʼí Faith
 ʻAbdu'l-Bahá – the appointed successor of Baháʼu'lláh

Other influential figures

Groups
 Afnán – the maternal relatives of the Báb
 Apostles of Baháʼu'lláh – nineteen eminent early followers of Baháʼu'lláh
 Baháʼu'lláh's family
 Hands of the Cause – a select group of Baháʼís, appointed for life, whose main function was to propagate and protect the Baháʼí Faith
 Knights of Baháʼu'lláh – a title given by Shoghi Effendi to Baháʼís who brought the Baháʼí Faith to new countries and territories

Notable individuals

 Shoghi Effendi – the appointed head of the Baháʼí Faith from 1921 until his death in 1957, entitled the Guardian
 Badíʻ – the 17-year-old who delivered Baháʼu'lláh's tablet to the Shah and was subsequently killed
 Nabíl-i-Aʻzam – the author of the account of early Bábí and Baháʼí history called The Dawn-breakers
 Mishkín-Qalam – a calligrapher who lived during the lifetime of Baháʼu'lláh, and designer of the Greatest Name
 Mírzá Abu'l-Faḍl – a Baháʼí scholar who travelled as far as America and authored several books about the Baháʼí Faith
 Martha Root – a prominent travelling teacher of the Baháʼí Faith in the late 19th and early 20th centuries
 Rúhíyyih Khánum – the wife of Shoghi Effendi, who was appointed a Hand of the Cause

Texts and scriptures
Baháʼí literature

By the Báb
 Persian Bayán – one of the principal scriptural writings of the Báb, the founder of Bábism, which is also revered in the Baháʼí Faith
 Arabic Bayán – one of the principal scriptural writings of the Báb, the founder of Bábism, which is also revered in the Baháʼí Faith
 Selections from the Writings of the Báb – a book of excerpts from notable works of the Báb, compiled by the Universal House of Justice, the highest authority in the Baháʼí Faith

By Baháʼu'lláh
List of writings of Baháʼu'lláh
 Epistle to the Son of the Wolf – the last major work of Baháʼu'lláh, written soon before his death in 1892
 Four Valleys – a mystical treatise written in Persian
 Gems of Divine Mysteries – a long epistle in Arabic
 Gleanings from the Writings of Baháʼu'lláh – a compilation of Baháʼu'lláh's writings selected by Shoghi Effendi
 Kitáb-i-Aqdas – a central book of the Baháʼí Faith which lays out the Baháʼí laws
 Kitáb-i-Íqán – the primary theological work of the Baháʼí Faith
 Hidden Words – a collection of short poetic utterances, 71 in Arabic and 82 in Persian
 The Seven Valleys – a mystical treatise written in Persian
 Summons of the Lord of Hosts – a collection of Baháʼu'lláh's writings that were written to the kings and rulers of the world
 Tabernacle of Unity – a collection of several of Baháʼu'lláh's writings first published in July 2006
 Tablets of Baháʼu'lláh Revealed After the Kitáb-i-Aqdas – a collection of Baháʼu'lláh's writings from later in his life that have been published together since 1978

By ʻAbdu'l-Bahá
 Paris Talks – a book transcribed from talks given by ʻAbdu'l-Bahá while in Paris.
 The Secret of Divine Civilization – a book written in 1875 by ʻAbdu'l-Bahá, addressed to the rulers and the people of Persia.
 Some Answered Questions – contains questions asked to ʻAbdu'l-Bahá, son of the founder of the Baháʼí Faith, by Laura Clifford Barney, during several of her visits to Haifa between 1904 and 1906, and ʻAbdu'l-Bahá's answers to these questions.
 Tablets of the Divine Plan – 14 letters (tablets) written between September 1916 and March 1917 by ʻAbdu'l-Bahá to Baháʼís in the United States and Canada.
 Tablet to Dr. Forel – a letter of ʻAbdu'l-Bahá, written in reply to questions asked by Auguste-Henri Forel, a Swiss myrmecologist, neuroanatomist and psychiatrist.
 Tablet to The Hague – a letter which ʻAbdu'l-Bahá wrote to the Central Organisation for Durable Peace in The Hague, The Netherlands on 17 December 1919.
 Will and Testament of ʻAbdu'l-Bahá – A seminal document, written in three stages by ʻAbdu'l-Bahá.

By Shoghi Effendi
 The Advent of Divine Justice – a letter to the Baháʼís of the United States and Canada, dated December 25, 1938
 God Passes By – an account of the first century of Baháʼí history (beginning with the declaration of the Báb in 1844)
 Promised Day is Come – a book-length letter written for Baháʼís in the Western world, dated 1941

By the Universal House of Justice 
 The Promise of World Peace

Organizations

Baháʼí administration
Baháʼí administration
 International Baháʼí Council – the precursor to the Universal House of Justice that existed from 1951–1963
 Universal House of Justice – the supreme governing institution of the Baháʼí Faith, first elected in 1963
 Spiritual Assemblies – a term given by ʻAbdu'l-Bahá to refer to elected councils that govern the Baháʼí Faith.
 Institution of the Counsellors
 International Teaching Centre
 Baháʼí International Community

Other Baháʼí organizations
 Baháʼí Esperanto League
 Baháʼí school
 Baháʼí Institute for Higher Education
 Banani International Secondary School
 Townshend International School
 School of the Nations (Macau)
 New Era High School
 Barli Development Institute for Rural Women
 FUNDAEC
 Ruhi Institute

Places
 Síyáh-Chál
 Garden of Ridván, Baghdad
 Báb's house
 Baháʼí World Centre
 Baháʼí World Centre buildings
 Shrine of the Báb
 Shrine of Baháʼu'lláh
 Qiblih – the point towards which Baháʼís face during their daily obligatory prayers
 Shrine of ʻAbdu'l-Bahá
 Terraces (Baháʼí)
 Baháʼí House of Worship – a place of worship of the Baháʼí Faith, also known as a Baháʼí temple
 List of Baháʼí Houses of Worship
 Lotus Temple
 Baháʼí House of Worship (Wilmette, Illinois)
 Sydney Baháʼí Temple
 Santiago Bahá'í Temple
 Haziratu'l-Quds – a Baháʼí administrative centre often used for Baháʼí gatherings, also known as a Baháʼí centre

Calendar
Baháʼí calendar
 List of observances set by the Baháʼí calendar
 Baháʼí Holy Days
 Baháʼí Naw-Rúz
 Ridván
 Twin Holy Birthdays
 Birth of Baháʼu'lláh
 Day of the Covenant (Baháʼí)
 Ayyám-i-Há

Other topics
 Alláh-u-Abhá
 Baháʼí Faith in fiction
 Baháʼí orthography
 Baháʼí studies
 Baháʼí review
 Baháʼí Studies Review
 Baháʼí symbols
 Criticism of the Baháʼí Faith
 Political objections to the Baháʼí Faith
 World Religion Day

External links 

 
Baha'i Faith
Baha'i Faith